Paprika is a 1932 German comedy film directed by Carl Boese and starring Franciska Gaal, Paul Hörbiger and Paul Heidemann. Made by the German branch of Universal Pictures, it was based on a hit play by Max Reimann and Otto Schwartz. A French-language version and an Italian-language version were released the following year. It is also known by the alternative title of Marriage in Haste. In the US, the film was released almost 2 years later in German on 18 May 1934 in the Yorkville theater under the title  Wie man Maenner fesselt (How to charm men).

It was shot at the Johannisthal Studios in Berlin. The film's sets were designed by the art director Gustav A. Knauer and Walter Reimann.

Cast

See also
 Paprika (1959), West German remake

References

Bibliography
 
 Klaus, Ulrich J. Deutsche Tonfilme: Jahrgang 1932. Klaus-Archiv, 1988.

External links

1932 films
German comedy films
1930s German-language films
German films based on plays
Films directed by Carl Boese
Films of the Weimar Republic
German multilingual films
German black-and-white films
1932 comedy films
1932 multilingual films
1930s German films
Films shot at Johannisthal Studios